George Stanley Seymour (16 May 1895 – 24 December 1978) was a footballer who played for Newcastle United then became manager, vice-chairman and director of the club. Born in Kelloe, Seymour is one of the club's all-time greats, and was known as 'Mr. Newcastle United' after the various years and roles he delivered for the club. As a player, despite his small physique, he was famous for his runs from the left wing.

Early career 
After originally being rejected by Newcastle United as a teenager (the local pit worker was told to 'come back when you grow up') he played some non-league football for Shildon Athletic and Coxhoe before joining Bradford City in 1911 for a short spell, making only one competitive appearance. He then joined Scottish side Greenock Morton. He developed as a player at Morton, becoming popular with the locals who called him 'The little Englishman'. Unlike in England, a fairly normal league season was played throughout the First World War in Scotland, and in all of Seymour's time in Greenock, Morton never finished outside the top four of what was a highly competitive league (the moment he had gone they slipped dramatically down the table). His performances were noticed back in England and he was eventually offered a transfer to the club who originally rejected him, Newcastle United, in 1920 for a fee of £2,500.

Newcastle United 
It did not take long for Seymour to become a crowd favourite at St. James' Park, his performances helped Newcastle reach the FA Cup Final with goals against Portsmouth, Derby County, Liverpool, and Manchester City before eventually going on to win the FA Cup in 1924 in a 2–0 win over Aston Villa, in which he scored a thunderous 20-yard half volley to secure the win. He was also part of the Newcastle team that were crowned Division One champions in 1926–27. Such displays also earned him a call-up to the England squad in a tour to Australia. However, in 1929, he was to leave the club after a disagreement with the officials over wages and a testimonial match. This was to be the end of his playing days as he decided to turn down the chance to join North-east rivals Middlesbrough and set up a sports shop in Newcastle upon Tyne, as he vowed 'never to kick a ball again'. He also later became involved in journalism. However his good service for Newcastle United was not forgotten and he was appointed the club's new Director in 1938.

As director he had control of first-team affairs, but like Frank Watt could not pick the team under the Director's Committee. However he had more influence on who could play than Watt had during his time at the club, and in fact did not believe that one man should have sole responsibility for picking the team. He was manager of the club with the Directors Committee from 1938 to 1954, aside from a period from 1947 to 1950 when George Martin took over the role. In 1943, Seymour gave a trial to a 19-year-old Jackie Milburn, who later became a club legend himself. The club won the FA Cup in 1951 and retained it in 1952 whilst Seymour was at the helm. Seymour became the first person in English football history to win the FA Cup with the same club as a player and manager.

In December 1954, Seymour stepped down from the manager's role and became the club's vice-chairman, appointing Doug Livingstone as the new manager. However, Seymour still believed that the manager's responsibilities should extend no further than training and motivating the players, something he demonstrated when Livingstone attempted to drop Jackie Milburn from the team for the 1955 FA Cup Final. Seymour responded to this by immediately relieving Livingstone of his ability to select the team, picking the eventual final team largely by himself, and saw Newcastle's victory in the final as vindication of his approach. By the end of the year Livingstone had been completely barred from working with the first team in any capacity, and his resignation near the start of 1956 allowed Seymour to fully take over the manager's role again. Newcastle's overall form deteriorated rapidly after this, though, and when the club only avoided relegation on goal average in 1958 it paved the way for chairman William McKeag (a bitter rival of Seymour's) to appoint Charlie Mitten as the new manager. Still, Seymour remained as part of the board until his death in 1978, and was appointed Life President of the club in 1976.

In a 2009 article written in The Times Online, Seymour was named Newcastle United's 5th Greatest player of all time. He scored 83 goals in 266 games for the club.

His son Stan Seymour, Jr. later became chairman of Newcastle United.

Legacy 
Jackie Milburn was once quoted saying "There is a great debt owed by Newcastle United to Stan Seymour for all of his services to the club".

Former Newcastle United player and manager Kevin Keegan promised during his first spell in charge to rename the club's Youth Academy after Seymour, but resigned before this could take place.

The North Eastern League Cup (in which teams from the Northern Football Alliance Premier Division compete in) was renamed the Stan Seymour League Cup in his honour.

Honours

Player
Greenock Morton
Scottish Football League runner-up: 1916–17 
Great War Shield winner: 1914–15

Newcastle United
Football League First Division winner: 1926–27 
FA Cup winner: 1924

Manager
Newcastle United
FA Cup winner: 1951, 1952

References

External links 
  at Spartacus Educational
  at NUFC.co.uk (Official Newcastle United website)
  at 123football.com

1895 births
1978 deaths
English footballers
England wartime international footballers
Newcastle United F.C. managers
Bradford City A.F.C. players
Greenock Morton F.C. players
Newcastle United F.C. players
Newcastle United F.C. directors and chairmen
Footballers from County Durham
Scottish Football League players
English Football League players
English Football League representative players
English Football League managers
Association football forwards
English football managers
People from Kelloe
FA Cup Final players